Tatort ("Crime scene") is a German language police procedural television series that has been running continuously since 1970 with some 30 feature-length episodes per year, which makes it the longest-running German TV drama. Developed by the German public-service broadcasting organisation ARD for their channel Das Erste, it is unique in its approach, in that it is jointly produced by all of the organisation's regional members as well as its partnering Austrian and Swiss national public-service broadcasters, whereby every regional station contributes a number of episodes to a common pool.

Therefore, the series is a collection of different police stories where different police teams each solve crimes in their respective city. Uniqueness in architecture, customs and dialects of the cities is therefore a distinctive part of the series and often the city, not the police force, is the real main character of an episode. The concept of local stations only producing a couple of shows per year has also enabled the shows to be longer (90 minutes) and more fleshed out psychologically than other weekly TV dramas.

The first episode was broadcast on 29 November 1970. Episodes are broadcast on ARD's main channel Das Erste on Sunday evening at the prime viewing time of 8:15 pm (just after the 8 pm Tagesschau news) around three times a month. Reruns are often shown by various regional ARD stations and on foreign broadcasters. Alongside the member stations of the ARD, the national Austrian broadcasting corporation Österreichischer Rundfunk joined the production pool in 1971 and airs the program on its ORF 2 channel. Switzerland's Schweizer Fernsehen joined the pool from 1990 to 2001 and again in 2011 and distributes its episodes through its channel SRF 1 and Play SRF streaming app..

The series Polizeiruf 110, which was produced by East Germany's state TV broadcaster as a counterpart to the West German Tatort and has a similar regional production approach, is still produced by ARD's regional broadcasters Mitteldeutscher Rundfunk (MDR), Rundfunk Berlin-Brandenburg (RBB), Norddeutscher Rundfunk (NDR) and Bayerischer Rundfunk (BR). Polizeiruf 110 shares the Sunday night prime time slot on Das Erste with Tatort.

Concept
The main feature of Tatort is that it is jointly produced by all participating regional TV stations. Each of the eleven companies involved (the nine German regional TV channels or Landesrundfunkanstalten that together form ARD, plus ORF in Austria and SRF in Switzerland), produces its own episodes. Each station features usually more than one team of inspectors in different cities in its region, depending on the size of the producing broadcaster. Each of the roughly 20 active teams appears one to two times each year. Nearly every Sunday, a new episode from a different city premieres on Das Erste; old episodes are often shown through all participating stations as part of their common programming. The series shares this concept with its former East German counterpart Polizeiruf 110, which basically is produced as four additional Tatort investigator teams aired under a different series name and opening credits by some regional broadcasters, mostly those which evolved from East German state television.

Every Tatort episode features a different team of inspectors in a different city. Combined with the fact that the episodes are, at 90 minutes long, almost movie-length and with rarely more than 30 episodes in one year, this makes for a cultural phenomenon closer to a string of made-for-TV movies than a typical police series.

This pooling concept was mainly due to the nature of the public broadcast television channel ARD, which is jointly operated by all of Germany's regional public Landesrundfunkanstalten. The 9 regional public broadcasters collect broadcasting fees in their region of Germany (each region comprising one or more federal states), and each have multiple radio stations and a regional TV station. Das Erste is produced as a joint national channel with common national programming. Each regional broadcaster is responsible for parts of the programming, unlike for instance in the US with its network affiliate system. Usually one to three broadcasters produce one TV programme in cooperation. When Tatort was developed as a series of weekly feature film-long local crime stories, the stated concept was used to distribute financial and organizational efforts.

Apart from the unique joint-pooling system, the series is also characterised by the episode length of around 90 minutes, which allows for more in-depth and psychological fleshing out of the characters. Although almost all episodes feature the investigation of a homicide, it is never just a simple case of whodunit. Often the episode length allows for the crime to be shown in all its aspects, with equal attention focused on the perpetrators and the victims as on the inspectors. On several occasions the actual police work is just a side note in the story, as the main plot might focus on how one of the persons involved deals with the crime and its aftermath. Episodes also deal with social and political issues.

With the national broadcasting corporations of Austria and Switzerland participating, the episodes of Tatort are currently set in various cities of Germany, Vienna, and Zurich. Originally each of the participating member stations limited their episodes to one team of investigators in one city: for ease of production this was mostly the city the broadcast station was in, but over the years some stations broadcasting over a large regional area have Tatorts playing in several cities. Notably, the WDR (based in Cologne) has three teams of investigators playing respectively in Cologne, Münster, and Dortmund. Episodes are either produced by the station's own production facilities, or are filmed and often also written by outside production houses on behalf of the station. This sometimes leads to situations where, for instance, a Tatort set in Thuringia is actually produced in Bavaria, with only a handful of scenes shot 'on location' in the town the story is supposed to be set in. As a consequence, minor roles are sometimes played by actors or extras that do not have the matching regional accent.

A similar concept of independently filming and then pooling episodes was used from 1988 to 1992 in the series Eurocops, jointly produced by several national European TV stations.

Tatort has not found wide distribution in non-German speaking countries, but some episodes were distributed as stand-alone mini series. Notable examples were the Horst Schimanski episodes which were shown in Finland in the late-1980s and on TV4 in Sweden in 1992, and the 2013 series starring Til Schweiger and Fahri Yardım in Hamburg was shown on the British Channel 4 under the title Nick's Law.

However, Tatort inspired many other TV broadcasters to develop similar city specific spin-offs for their shows, such as CSI or NCIS.

History
Gunther Witte, dramatist and TV head at WDR (West German Broadcasting Cologne), developed the series against initial resistance. Witte and his successors have ensured that one or two detectives are at the center of every story, and the cases are shown from their perspective; they are usually members of a team, and their lives are also included.

In January 2008 a similarly produced series of radio dramas called ARD Radio Tatort was introduced, new episodes are aired monthly by regional radio stations, but not at the same time.

In 2012, more than 100,000 people participated in the first and only online game linked to the SWR Tatort production, "Der Wald steht schwarz und schweiget".

In January 2014, Tatort received the 50th Grimme Award.

Features
The show is still aired on Sundays at 8:15 p.m. in Germany and Austria, and 8:05 p.m. in Switzerland. About 30 episodes are made each year. By May 2018, 1055 episodes had been produced, plus 13 made in Austria and shown only there. Episode nr. 1000 was broadcast on Sunday 13 November 2016.

The episodes of some series of Tatort, such as the discontinued series about Schimanski, played by Götz George, have become cultural icons.

The opening sequence of each episode has essentially remained the same throughout the decades except for slight changes. Klaus Doldinger composed the title music with Udo Lindenberg on drums.

In East Germany
At the same time the ARD was starting its Tatort format, the DDR had its own police procedural/crime show called Polizeiruf 110 ("Police dial 1-1-0"). The series premiered in 1971, less than a year after the first Tatort. It too was a police procedural, with various teams of investigators in various cities of the DDR, but in contrast to the West, only a small part of their cases involved actual homicides. The psychology of the perpetrators and the victims was also more prevalent. The series continued through all of the 1970s and 80s and even survived the Wende, continuing until 1991.

In 1990, Polizeiruf practiced its own brand of German unification with episode 142,  ("Amongst Brothers"), a crossover with the Tatort investigators Schimanski and Thanner (this was co-produced with ARD and a medley of the two series themes were used in the opening intro). Until 1991, the series continued more or less independently for 11 more episodes until episode 153 (22 December 1991), again a crossover, in which Kommissar Thanner becomes the team's superior. Also in 1991, as part of the unification, the DDR's television company DFF was split into the Mitteldeutscher Rundfunk (MDR) and Ostdeutscher Rundfunk Brandenburg (ORB) while the television stations in the new state of Mecklenburg-Vorpommern would be operated as part of the NDR.

As MDR, ORB and NDR were all partners in the ARD, it was expected that they would start producing Tatort episodes as well. However, seeing the popularity of Polizeiruf 110, it was decided that the stations would contribute to the Tatort pool, but that its episodes would keep the name of Polizeiruf 110 and their own title music and intro. Still, they would be broadcast over all ARD stations on Sunday evening just like (or instead of) the 'western' Tatort.

Reorganising took one and a half years, but on 13 June 1993, the now MDR restarted the series in Tatort format. This first episode was set in Leipzig, just as in 1991. However, today's episodes produced by the MDR are set in Magdeburg, while those produced by NDR are set in Rostock. The ORB (and later ORB's successor, RBB) has its episodes headed by the same team of investigators, but take place in various cities of Brandenburg. In addition, Bavarian Broadcasting BR produces both Polizeiruf and Tatort episodes, both set in Munich. Like the original, the Bavarian Polizeiruf episodes focus more on the psychology of the crimes and more on crimes other than homicides. Over the years several other 'western' local broadcasters tried their hand at producing Polizeiruf episodes as a sort of 'alternative Tatort' alongside the regular ones. However, all of them stopped after a few episodes.

On 15 May 2015, RBB aired the 350th episode of Polizeiruf 110, the 197th episode of the new format.

In 2013, seeing that Thuringia was so far the only federal state in Germany that had neither a Tatort nor a Polizeiruf set in one of its cities, the MDR ordered two new Tatort series, set in Erfurt and Weimar respectively. Both are produced for the MDR by Bavarian companies.

As 1-1-0 is the speed dial code for police/emergency dispatch in Germany, but not in Austria, Polizeiruf 110 is broadcast in Austria as Polizeiruf 133.

United States & Canada
 2019 Walter's Choice has been presenting some individual series from this Anthology Show on the PBS Public Broadcasting System Network, while Walter Presents streams the programs.  In both cases the Anthology name Tatort is dropped and new individual series titles are created.

INSPECTOR THORSTEN FALKE 

DRESDEN DETECTIVES (2016- ) 

1) 2016 "Hit Song"
| Their first case takes our lady detectives into the world of German Schlager pop music. During rehearsals for the show "The Music Plays Here", Toni, one of the local celebs from duo Toni & Tina, was found behind the scenes, bludgeoned to death. His wife and singing partner Tina is desperate, for his manager of many years Rollo it's like he's lost a son.

2) 2016 "The King of the Gutters"
| Popular social entrepreneur Hans-Martin Taubert falls from a bridge and survives but is severely injured. Dresden detectives Henni Sieland and Karin Gorniak meet three homeless witnesses who claim that Taubert was actually thrown from the bridge. Taubert had founded "Berberhilfe", a company that provides accommodation to homeless people and others needing help. He had become wealthy from the poor and clearly made no secret of it. The three homeless men claim to be Taubert's "security" – he had been threatened frequently in recent times.

3) 2017 "Level X"
|  While playing a prank on a local rock group, Simson is shot by an unknown attacker. Despite there being any number of people who witnessed the crime in person and live on the Internet, there are no reliable descriptions of the attacker. Dresden detectives Henni Sieland and Karin Gorniak dive deep into the world of social media stars, where they must face the fact that they don't know a great deal about these hugely popular teenage idols or the business structures behind them.

4) 2017 "Eye For An Eye"
| Dresden detectives Karin Gorniak and Henni Sieland are investigating the murder of Heiko Gebhardt, branch manager of a large insurance firm, where claims are rigorously handled according to the motto "Challenge. Dispute. Block". Gebhardt was not only deeply unpopular with his employees but also with the disappointed insurance clients. Former colleague Martina Scheuring, a lawyer, now represents these people who have suffered twice and is helping them to fight for their rights with all means available to her. The investigation leads the detectives into the world of insurance, where using great pressure and dubious methods, profit is pursued above all else.

5) 2018 "DÉJÀ VU"
| Nine-year old Rico disappears without a trace. Shortly afterwards his body is found by a group of kids in a bag on the banks of the Elbe. Dresden detectives Henni Sieland and Karin Gorniak struggle to cope with the city is in uproar, the media stoking fear, and everyone wants answers quickly. 

6) 2018 "Tender Trap"
| 22-year old student, Doro Meisner is strangled in a car park outside a night club – apparently an act of revenge by the bird hunters, a group of men who had all been scammed by Doro alias Birdy via an online dating portal "Lovetender". There are no traces at the scene of the crime and the cheated marks claim to have had nothing to do with the murder. In order to move the investigation along quickly, Karin Gorniak and Henni Sieland decide to go undercover – against the wishes of their boss, Schnabel.

**This would be the last appearance of Henni Sieland as she burns out**

7) 2019 "The Nest"
| Dresden detective Karin Gorniak is severely injured and hospitalized when her new colleague Leonie Winkler makes a critical error during a dangerous deployment. The murderer they were after manages to escape. Winkler must take over the case in her absence. Gorniak is soon released from hospital, but she is the only one to have seen the perpetrator and can identify him. Her life is in danger as long as the killer walks free.

8) 2019 "Nemisis"
| The murder of a famous Dresden restaurateur leads detectives Gorniak and Hennrichs into the murky world of organized crime, but could the real killer be closer to home and in a much darker place?

9) 2020 "The Time Has Come"
| Anna and Louis want to get their lives back on track - steady work for both of them, no more parties, no more drugs and a proper home for their 12-year-old son Tim. But when a neighbour is found beaten to death in front of their house, the Dresden detectives Gorniak and Winkler investigate – including the lives of Anna and Louis. Louis has a criminal record. 

Episodes 10) "Parasemonia", 11) "Threatened Saviours", 12) "Invisible", 13) "The Cold House", 14) "Cat and Mouse" have yet to be released in the United States as of the end of 2022.

 2017 MHz Network started streaming series from Tatort, retaining the original Tatort titles.

Tatort: Borowski

Tatort: Cologne

(MHz calls this the start of ‘season 1’)

1.    Welcome to Cologne (October 4, 1997) After a Miami drug bust goes sour, German cop Max Ballauf is sent home to be Cologne's homicide chief, and is immediately confronted with partner Freddy Schenk's professional jealousy - and the dead body of a former colleague.

2.    Blown-Up Spirits (October 11, 1997) A teacher recently acquitted of sexual molestation charges is killed by a bomb blast at his school. Ballauf and Schenk struggle to piece together what happened when a second death rocks the campus.

3.    Manila (April 18, 1998) While investing a highway rest stop robbery/murder, Ballauf picks up a little Filipino boy in flight. Could he be the lead they need to bust an international child-trafficking ring?

4.    Iconoclasm (June 20, 1998) The body of a banker is found in the woods near Cologne; next to his body is a pile of charred bank notes. Protesters threaten violence over an exhibit of photos documenting Nazi atrocities.

5.    Secret Mission (October 10, 1998) A woman's body is fished out of the Rhine, and the victim turns out to be an acquaintance of Ballauf's. The investigation leads to a chemical company, and the German intelligence services are found to be involved.

6.    Residual Risk (February 13, 1999) A dancer is found murdered near the grounds of a psychiatric hospital, and the prime suspect is a patient with a history of violence. But is the patient merely a pawn in a devilish game?

7.    Children of Violence (May 1, 1999) A boy is found dead in a school bathroom, and Max goes undercover to investigate. He discovers an ongoing war between gangs of German and Turkish teenagers.

8.    Light and Shade (July 3, 1999) Freddy and Max investigate the death of a wealthy gynecologist who's found dead in his swimming pool. A prominent Pro-Life group is suspected, but the search for the killer leads to a maze of half-truths and evasions.

9.    Three Monkeys (September 25, 1999) After a colleague’s long-time girlfriend is killed in the courtyard of a crowded apartment complex, the victim was secretly pregnant. Who was the father of the child, and why was the victim planning a secret move to Hamburg?

10.   Martinsfire (December 4, 1999) The body of a four-year-old boy is found in a working class area. Max befriends Mirko, an emotionally neglected eight-year-old who may know more than he's willing to admit. 

11.    Bitter Almonds (March 4, 2000) The body of wealthy real estate magnate Gerd Wesibach is found, his pores emanating a familiar odor: bitter almonds. Is it assisted suicide or murder?

12.   Deadly Inheritance (July 15, 2000) A blackmailer has been threatening the Kölsch brewery in Cologne. Concerned with his company's reputation, Belcher Sr. decides to pay the ransom in person, and is soon shot dead. 

13.    Straight into the Heart (August 5, 2000) A man is shot to death in broad daylight on a busy street in Cologne. However, no shots were heard. 

14.   The Lady on the Train (December 16, 2000) On a family trip to Holland, Freddy finds himself suspected of drug smuggling and is forced to go on the run to clear his name.

15.    Murder Pit (February 24, 2001) After a law student is shot on a college campus, Max suspects her hot-tempered ex-fiancé - but Freddy senses something more sinister.

16.    Death of a Child (June 16, 2001) After a badly-beaten child is left unclaimed at the ER, Ballauf and Schenk discover a flawed system unable to prevent child abuse.

17.     Beasts (November 24, 2001) When the daughter of a biker is brutally raped and murdered, Ballauf and Schenk must overcome their prejudices to make sure justice is served.

(MHz calls this the start of ‘season 2’)

18.    Charges (March 2, 2002) An investigation into a murder at a warehouse leads Ballauf and Schenk into the deaf community. 

19.    Sleep Well, My Dear (June 15, 2002) When lumberjacks find a murdered woman in the woods, it appears that a recently-released serial killer is at it again.

20.    Betrayal (August 31, 2002) Ballauf and Schenk find that the professional murder of a diplomat is linked to a massacre at an overseas embassy.

21.     Payback (November 9, 2002) Ballauf and Schenk are joined by their East German colleagues Ehrlicher and Kain to investigate an art heist gone wrong.

22.    A Mother's Love (March 22, 2003) A hospital worker is murdered right after an anonymous woman leaves a newborn in the baby drop-off. 

23.    Without a Trace (April 26, 2003) Schenk walks into a bloody bank heist involving a kidnapped senior citizen strapped with explosives. 

24.    The Phantom (June 8, 2003) Schenk discovers that a young man he helped convict and imprison may not have been guilty.

25.    Bermuda (September 13, 2003) Ballauf and Schenk try to solve a murder with the help of teenagers living in a halfway house.

(MHz calls this the start of ‘season 3’)

26.    A Dog's Life (April 11, 2004) Freddy puts his grandmother in a nursing home and investigates a murder there in the same week.

27.     Odin's Revenge (July 10, 2004) The police suspect revenge by an immigrant family when a skinhead gets targeted by a sniper. 

28.     Betrayed and Sold (September 18, 2004) Freddy goes undercover as a janitor at an elite boarding school to investigate a series of murders. 

29.     Ghost Town (February 12, 2005) The severed thumb of a fugitive cop killer comes to Max and Freddy in the mail, leading them to a deserted town.

30.     Mine Games (May 7, 2005) One of the owners of a mine-removal nonprofit gets blown up during a jog, and his wife seems curiously unmoved.

31.      Frozen (August 20, 2005) A beloved figure skating celebrity and competition judge is found dead on the ice.

32.     Blood Diamonds (March 16, 2006) A shooting at a political demonstration thrusts Freddy and Max into a web of international conspiracy and intrigue.

33.     Pechmarie (March 18, 2006) A diamond heist turned deadly causes Ballauf and Schenk to protect the sister of one of the outlaws. 

34.     The Flowers of Evil (December 31, 2006) Max gets commended in the paper for excellent police work, and finds himself targeted by a maniac in response. 

Tatort: Munich (2009-2017)

1.    At Any Cost (10/17/2009) Ivo's childhood friend comes under suspicion for murder.

2.    We're the Good Guys (12/12/2009) Ivo has amnesia and is suspected of murdering a colleague.

3.    The Saint (10/02/2010) A prison guard becomes personally involved with the inmates.

4.    Undying Beauty (11/20/2010) A woman fixated on staying beautiful dies mysteriously in a chocolate bath.

5.    Never Free Again (12/18/2010) Franz and Ivo seek justice after an alleged rapist is acquitted.

6.    Hunting Season (4/9/2011) A terrified young woman won't talk about a crime she witnessed.

7.    Yesterday Never Happened (6/10/2011) An elderly glassmaker with dementia confesses to a murder.

8.    A Regular Murder (11/26/2011) Investigating a synagogue murder requires discretion as Ivo and Franz question members of the community.

9.    At the End of the Hall (5/03/2014) Franz puts his job in jeopardy to solve the murder of a young woman.

10.   The Desert Son (9/13/2014) Franz and Ivo come up against diplomatic immunity as they investigate a Middle Eastern prince.

11.    The Last Oktoberfest (9/19/2015) It's Oktoberfest and mysterious deaths keep happening.

12.    This is Going to Hurt (4/02/2016) Ivo and Franz reopen a case they think should have been more fully investigated.

13.    The Truth (10/22/2016) Franz obsesses over the most perplexing case of his career.

14.    Love is a Strange Game (5/20/2017) (Contains sexually explicit content) A successful architect is suspected of killing multiple lovers.

Tatort: Streets of Berlin (2015-2021)

1.    The Mule (2015) An apartment bathroom is covered in blood with no body in sight.

2.    Corrosive (2015) Karow searches for the killer of his former partner.

3.    Us - Her – Them (2016) A group of high school girls close ranks over a hit-and-run. 

4.     Dark Field (2016) Karow is held hostage after his key witness gets gunned down in front of him.

5.     Crazy Love (2017) A teacher accused of sexually harassing a student is found torched in his garden.

6.     Your Name is Harbinger (2017) A mentally-ill locksmith thinks he's receiving messages directing him to procure victims.

7.     META (2018) A package with a severed finger leads Rubin and Karow to an art film eerily paralleling their investigation.

8.     Urban Beasts (2018) Rubin and Karow investigate a jogger attacked by a boar and a man murdered in a coffee kiosk.

9.     The Good Path (2019) Nina's son Tolja joins the police as an intern and gets shot on a routine call.

10.  The Afterlife (2019) Robert discovers he's been living next door to a decaying corpse.

11.  The Perfect Crime (2020) A secret society of law students exercise strange control over a new member. 

12.  A Few Words After Midnight (2020) The murder of a 90-year-old Berlin building tycoon appears to be politically motivated. 

13.  No Place Like Home (2021) A realtor is murdered during evictions of an apartment building slated for remodel. 

14.  The Cold and the Dead (2021) Karow and Rubin investigate the brutal death of a woman active in Berlin's night life.

Tatort: Weimar (2013-2018)

1.   The Big Hoppe (2013) Weimar's Sausage Queen goes missing and a surprising turn of events occurs when the police get a phone call.

2.   The Wrong Ivan (2015) As Dorn and Lessing investigate the death of a woman during a robbery, it becomes clear that all is not as it seems. 

3.   Losing Lupo (2017) After discovering he has two days to live, Lupo takes the police chief hostage to force Dorn and Lessing to hand over his murderer.

4.   The Gobi Desert (2017) Dorn and Lessing are on the hunt for a serial killer who escaped a psychiatric ward.

5.   Cold Fritte (2018) After a billionaire is killed during a burglary, the victim's wife shoots and kills the perp.

6.   Robust Roswita (2018) A woman presumed dead for seven years reappears with a patchy memory.

7.   Hardcore (2018) Lessing is accused of murder and it's up to Dorn to exonerate him.

Tatort: Lindholm (2008-2017)

Missing are the first 12 episodes: Lanstrum Mix / Dance of the Witches / Sun and Storm / HomeMatch / Fairy Tale Forest / Dark Ways / Breathless / Dark Heat / Pauline / The Girl With No Name / To Whom Honor Is Due / Thanksgiving. As well as episode 24) Taxi to Leipzig,

13.  "Salt Mummy"(aka The Salt Corpse)
(11/5/2008) A salt mine reveals the mummified body of a security guard reported missing months earlier.

14. "The Ghost"(aka Apparition)
(3/14/2009) Charlotte's Childhood friend re-enters her life as a crime suspect and terrorist.

15. "There Will Be Pain and Suffering"(aka There Will Be Sorrow and Pain)
(9/29/2009) A Sniper wreaks havoc in Lower Saxony.

16. "Forgotten Memories"
(1/30/2010) Driving at night, Charlotte sees a man in the road and swerves to miss him, crashing off the road. When rescuers arrive the mystery man is gone with no evidence he was ever there. (This is this author's favorite episode)

**Roommate & Babysitter Martin leaves the series**

17. "The Last Patient"
(10/20/2010) Arson results in a woman's death and a mentally disturbed boy may be the sole witness.

18. "Murder in the First Devision"
(3/9/2011) A high-stakes game of professional soccer proves fatal.

19. "Black Tigers, White Lions"
(12/10/2011) Charlotte delves into the secrets of a man found murdered in the countryside.

20 "The Disposable Girl"
(12/8/2012) (PART 1) The body of a 16 year old girl turns up in an incineration plant.

21. "The Golden Band"
12/15/2012 | (PART 2) Charlotte finds herself in High Society circles while investigating the murdered 16 year old girl.

22. "The Smooth Death"
(12/6/2014) A large meat producer appears to be a murder target just as he's about to roll out a new product. (Picture aspect for this episode only changes from 16x9 to wider 2x1)

23. "Killjoy"
(11/21/2015) The murder of a military pilot's wife reveals an unwritten code of honor.

25. "The Holdt Case"
(9/13/2017) Charlotte takes on an escalating kidnapping case after the victims have handed over the money.

Tatort: Lindholm and Schmitz (2019-  )

**Inspector Lindholm is transferred to Gottingen KRIPO (Kriminal Polizei) and given a partner as punishment for tragic events in "The Holt Case".**

26. "The Missing Child"
(2/2/2019) (began streaming 11/22/2022) A 15-year-old girl and her newborn baby are missing, leaving behind only a trail of blood and unanswered questions. For the first time in her career, Charlotte is paired with a partner – a female detective, Anais Schmitz (Florence Kasumba), who is as prickly and aggressive as Lindholm.

27. "War In he Head" (9/28/2020) (began streaming 11/30/2022) A Split-second decision during a standoff sends Lindholm and Schmitz down an Orwellian rabbit hold of conspiracy and deceit.

28. "National  Feminine"   (streaming announced for December 2022)

Table of broadcasters 
There have been over 1100 episodes of Tatort, from November 1970 up to the beginning of January 2020 these have been the product of a dozen broadcasters, based around various lead investigators. While some (about 30) have featured only once or twice, a number of investigators have featured in multiple episodes. There are 22 current investigative strands, and three have been the subject of over 70 episodes.

Last update: 28 Nov 2022

Soundtracks (selection) 
Some Tatort episodes from the 1980s and 1990s included songs that subsequently became quite well known, and two of them reached the top of the charts:
"Faust auf Faust (Schimanski)" by Klaus Lage from the Tatort movie , and "Midnight Lady" by Chris Norman, written by Dieter Bohlen, which appears on the episode .
Some random selected soundtracks:

See also
Dead Pigeon on Beethoven Street (1974, Tatort episode 25)
Reifezeugnis (1977, Tatort episode 73)
Es lebe der Tod (Long Live Death) (2016, Tatort episode 1001)

References

Further reading 
 .

External links 

 Official Tatort pages at Das Erste
 Videos about Tatort in ARD Mediathek
 

 
ARD (broadcaster)
German crime television series
German drama television series
Das Erste original programming
1970 German television series debuts
Austrian crime television series
Swiss crime television series
Austrian drama television series
Swiss drama television series
1971 Austrian television series debuts
1990 Swiss television series debuts
Television shows set in Berlin
Television shows set in Cologne
Television shows set in Dortmund
Television shows set in Frankfurt
Television shows set in Hamburg
Television shows set in Munich
Television shows set in Münster
1970s Austrian television series
1980s Austrian television series
1990s Austrian television series
2000s Austrian television series
2010s Austrian television series
1990s Swiss television series
2000s Swiss television series
2010s Swiss television series
1980s German television series
1990s German television series
2000s German television series
2010s German television series
German-language television shows
Grimme-Preis for fiction winners
German police procedural television series
1970s German police procedural television series
1980s German police procedural television series
1990s German police procedural television series
2000s German police procedural television series
2010s German police procedural television series
2020s German police procedural television series